Pinocchio (Soundtrack from the Netflix Film) is the soundtrack album to the 2022 stop-motion animated musical dark fantasy film of the same name. Based on the 1883 Italian novel The Adventures of Pinocchio by Carlo Collodi, and Gris Grimly's design from his 2002 edition of the novel, the film, directed by Guillermo del Toro and Mark Gustafson, stars  Ewan McGregor, David Bradley, Gregory Mann, Burn Gorman, John Turturro, Ron Perlman, Finn Wolfhard, Cate Blanchett, Tim Blake Nelson, Christoph Waltz, and Tilda Swinton. The score is composed by Alexandre Desplat in his second collaboration with del Toro after The Shape of Water (2017). The album featuring the original score and songs were set for release digitally on December 9, 2022 and in physical formats on December 16 by Columbia Records.

Background 
On August 23, 2012, Australian musician Nick Cave was reported to be involved in the project, but could not do so and the film went into development hell, until Netflix brought the film rights and revived the project in October 2018. On January 8, 2020, Alexandre Desplat was reported to compose the film score, thereby collaborating with del Toro, for the second time after The Shape of Water (2017).  While discussing the film's music in Deadline Hollywood's Sound & Screen interview, Desplat said, "Like in The Shape of Water, there are so many emotions. In both of these films, there are strong social and political content. In Pinocchio, it's fascism with the movie being set in 1930s Italy. All of this together creates tension that the music can convey."

As with most of the projects, Desplat began scoring for the film after seeing the film's rough cut since he likes to see the images to see how the actors move and interact with one another. The score for Pinocchio was created mostly using wooden instruments since Desplat likes "to find an ensemble of instruments that reflect the film or soul of the film" and the "softness" of the sound of wood. The sounds were implemented using assortment of woodwind, wooden percussions, strings, piano, harp, mandolin and guitar, and also an accordion made of wood.

Del Toro and Desplat made their maiden attempt in songwriting and composition, while Desplat's longtime friend and lyricist Roeban Katz had also contributed to the original songs. Desplat feels that working on original songs is "like a Lego game, as there is a big castle to build because there is this history of incredible songwriters before us for cinema and for animation — from the Sherman Brothers, Richard Rodgers to so many great songwriters. So you’re trying to have a conversation with the past, and at the same time, you try to play with this Lego castle that you have in front of you and build the most beautiful object that you can." He compared the musical style of Pinocchio to that of Cole Porter and George Gershwin. The songs were interwoven into the film score, with new melodies being created. He added that "all the songs come back as instrumental motif through this score. They come back in many, many forms, different forms, shapes, tones, [tempo], and I think it gives the whole film continuity that would have been different if we would not have used the melody of the songs". The original songs were performed by the film's cast members, and all of them were recorded at various places. He added the songs are not lengthy, and it will not impact the film's storytelling.

Composition 
Del Toro wrote the original song "Ciao Papa" which he described it as "the most moving song in the film, and the most important song. It talks about longing, it talks about the loss of a father, the loss of a son. It talks about the sort of wistful energy that, for me, is at the core of the tale of Pinocchio." Desplat added that the song was not interwoven into the score, hence it stands apart from the other musical numbers; he wanted to be a unique moment on the relationship between Pinocchio and Geppetto, and added "The combination of these two words — ‘Ciao,’ which is Italian, and ‘Papa,’ which works in any language — I felt that if the melody was as simple as these two words, it would be very easy to remember and to catch for anyone."

On "The Pine Cone" melody, Desplat wanted to capture Geppetto’s grief in a pivotal moment, as he loses his child. Desplat set the theme "to be dramatic, and at the same time, extremely moving without being over the top or too romantic", adding that it is "difficult to find the music of grief". Desplat felt that Geppetto's son Carlo is the center of the film, in spite of his limited screen time, and that Pinocchio is the reincarnation of Carlo, adding, "It takes the whole film for Geppetto to admit that Pinocchio is his son replacing Carlo. That’s what Geppetto wants — he wants to find his little son again that he lost during the First World War." Hence for "Carlo's theme", he wanted to make the melody as similar to both characters, saying "It’s not only Carlo’s theme. It’s the theme of the little boy, of the lost soul — and of the hope that you have on your children to become one day, another person. As Pinocchio becomes Geppetto’s son, the theme takes over and becomes Pinocchio’s theme."

Promotion and release 
The track "Ciao Papa" was released as the single from the album on November 18. The original soundtrack was announced by Columbia Records on the same date and is set for release digitally on December 9, followed by a physical release on December 16.

Live performances 
Desplat conducted the film's score at Netflix Playlist, a showcase of music from film and television on November 7, 2022. Besides conducting the film's music, he also brought a young girl to perform "Ciao Papa" on stage. Steven Gizicki, the music supervisor of the film, had opined it as "one of Desplat's best scores". He also appeared at the Deadline Hollywood's Sound & Screen conference and conducted the 60-piece orchestra at the live performance of the film score.

Track listing 
All music is composed by Alexandre Desplat.

Reception 
Mark Feeney of the Boston Globe wrote, "Alexandre Desplat’s score and songs — among other things, the movie’s sort of a musical — are a prime contributor to the sentimentality." Robert Abele of the Los Angeles Times said, "The songs, though, by composer Alexandre Desplat and often sporting Del Toro’s own lyrics, benefit from being interludes of feeling instead of big showy numbers, particularly the nicely turned 'Ciao Papa'". Patrick Gibbs of Slug Magazine called the score as "gorgeous and lively". Fred Topel of United Press International wrote, "The all new songs by Alexandre Desplat sound like a child making up a song as he goes along, rather than Disney songwriters."

Release history

Accolades 
The song "Ciao Papa" for the film, is intended to be potential contender for Best Original Song category at the 95th Academy Awards, according to Billboard magazine. Los Angeles Times critic Michael Ordoña hinted the possiblities of the song being nominated in various ceremonies, including Academy Awards.

References 

2022 soundtrack albums
Columbia Records soundtracks
Alexandre Desplat soundtracks
Pinocchio